Kapiti was a New Zealand parliamentary electorate, from 1972 to 1996. A bellwether electorate, it frequently changed between National and Labour.

Population centres
There were 84 electorates for the 1969 election, and the 1972 electoral redistribution saw three additional general seats created for the North Island, bringing the total number of electorates to 87. Together with increased urbanisation in Christchurch and Nelson, the changes proved very disruptive to existing electorates. In the South Island, three electorates were abolished, and three electorates were newly created. In the North Island, five electorates were abolished, two electorates were recreated, and six electorates were newly created (including Kapiti).

The main population centres in the electorate were Paraparaumu, Otaki, Raumati Beach, Raumati South and Waikanae, north of Wellington on the Kapiti Coast. The 1977 electoral redistribution saw the electorate move south, and Otaki and Waikanae transferred to the newly created  electorate. Waikanae came back to the Kapiti electorate through the 1987 electoral redistribution.

In 1996 with the introduction of mixed-member proportional (MMP) representation, Paraparaumu south of the airport and Raumati went into the Mana electorate, while Waikanae and the rest of Paraparaumu went into the Ōtaki electorate.

History
The electorate changed between National and Labour several times. National's Allan McCready had represented the  electorate since  and when Otaki was abolished in 1972 and the  electorate moved towards the south and included the town of Levin, McCready transferred to Manawatu. Brill served until  when he was beaten by Labour's Margaret Shields. Shields had initially been declared the winner of the  but she lost by 83 votes on a magisterial recount.

The Kapiti electorate was abolished in 1996, and most of its area went to the re-established Otaki electorate. Sowry stood for Otaki, was defeated by Labour's Judy Keall, but remained in Parliament as a list MP.

Members of Parliament
Key

Election results

1993 election

1990 election

1987 election

1984 election

1981 election

1978 election

1975 election

1972 election

Notes

References

Historical electorates of New Zealand
Politics of the Wellington Region
1972 establishments in New Zealand
1996 disestablishments in New Zealand